Paul Eric Camps (born 13 September 1989) is a German footballer who plays as a midfielder for SVE Comet Kiel.

Career
Camps made his professional debut for Holstein Kiel in the 3. Liga on 8 May 2010, coming on as a substitute in the 58th minute for Fynn Gutzeit in the 4–3 home win against Borussia Dortmund II.

References

External links
 Profile at DFB.de
 Profile at kicker.de
 SVE Comet Kiel statistics at Fussball.de

1989 births
Living people
German footballers
Association football midfielders
Holstein Kiel II players
Holstein Kiel players
3. Liga players
Regionalliga players